The 2018 CWHL Draft, the ninth and final in league history, took place on August 26. It marked the first and only draft Jayna Hefford served as CWHL commissioner. The CWHL indicated that general managers were authorized to "pre-sign" their first and second round selections before the draft. The window for pre-signing expired on August 17. Lauren Williams, a Canadian player and alumna of the Wisconsin Badgers women's ice hockey program, was the first pick overall in the draft. Long after this draft, the CWHL discontinued operations on May 1, 2019, having announced its intention on March 31.

Draft presigning

Trades
On December 13, 2017, Erin Ambrose was traded from the Toronto Furies to Les Canadiennes de Montreal. The Furies received first and third round picks in the 2018 CWHL Draft, a first round pick from the 2019 CWHL Draft, plus a third round pick from the 2020 CWHL Draft. With the CWHL's dissolution, the 2019 and 2020 picks were extinguished.

Results

Rounds 1–5

References

Canadian Women's Hockey League